Mitchel Bakker (born 20 June 2000) is a Dutch professional footballer who plays as a left-back for Bundesliga club Bayer Leverkusen.

Club career

Ajax 
Bakker made his debut for Ajax in a 7–0 KNVB Cup win against Te Werve on 26 September 2018. He played his second and final game for the senior team in a 3–0 cup win against Go Ahead Eagles on 31 October 2018.

Paris Saint-Germain 
On 7 July 2019, Mitchel Bakker signed for Paris Saint-Germain (PSG) on a free transfer. His contract tied him to the club for four seasons.

Bakker made his debut for PSG on 29 January 2020 in a 2–0 Coupe de France win against Pau, coming on as a substitute. He made his first start for the club in a 6–1 cup win against Dijon on 12 February, and made his first Ligue 1 appearance and start in a 4–4 draw against Amiens on 15 February. After the Ligue 1 season was ended early due to the COVID-19 pandemic, PSG was awarded the title. On 15 June, Bakker was nominated for the Golden Boy, being one of three PSG players in the 100-player shortlist; he was later included in the list of the top 20 candidates. On 24 July, Bakker started and played all 90 minutes in the 2020 Coupe de France Final against Saint-Étienne. The final score was 1–0 for PSG. In the 2020 Coupe de la Ligue Final on 31 July, he played the entire match as PSG won 6–5 on penalties against Lyon.

On 20 October 2020, Bakker made his UEFA Champions League debut, coming on as a substitute in a 2–1 loss against Manchester United. Due to injuries to Juan Bernat and Layvin Kurzawa, Bakker had more play time in the 2020–21 season than he did in the previous one; by the end of the campaign, he had made 40 appearances. He notably started in PSG's 2–1 Champions League semi-final loss to Manchester City on 28 April 2021. Bakker won the Trophée des Champions and Coupe de France in his final season in Paris.

Bayer Leverkusen 
On 12 July 2021, Bakker joined Bundesliga club Bayer Leverkusen. He signed a four-year contract with the club. According to reports, the transfer fee of the deal was of 7 million euros, potentially rising to 10 million with bonuses. A buy-back option for PSG was reportedly included in the deal. Bakker scored his first goal for Leverkusen in a 4–0 win over Borussia Mönchengladbach on 21 August.

International career 
Bakker is a youth international for the Netherlands. He has represented his home country from under-15 to under-21 level.

In October 2022, Bakker was included in the preliminary squad for the 2022 FIFA World Cup.

Career statistics

Honours 
Jong Ajax
 Eerste Divisie: 2017–18

Ajax
 KNVB Cup: 2018–19

Paris Saint-Germain
Ligue 1: 2019–20
Coupe de France: 2019–20, 2020–21
Coupe de la Ligue: 2019–20
Trophée des Champions: 2020

References

External links 

 Profile at the Paris Saint-Germain F.C. website
 

2000 births
Living people
Dutch footballers
Association football defenders
Association football fullbacks
Netherlands under-21 international footballers
Netherlands youth international footballers
Eerste Divisie players
Ligue 1 players
Bundesliga players
Jong Ajax players
AFC Ajax players
Paris Saint-Germain F.C. players
Bayer 04 Leverkusen players
People from Purmerend
Dutch expatriate footballers
Expatriate footballers in France
Expatriate footballers in Germany
Dutch expatriate sportspeople in France
Dutch expatriate sportspeople in Germany
Footballers from North Holland
21st-century Dutch people